The Shen Chong case, also referred to as the Peiping rape case, was a rape case in 1946 that sparked a nationwide anti-American movement in the Republic of China. It involved United States Marines stationed in China (the "China Marines") raping a Chinese university student in Peking (Beijing).

The case
On Christmas Eve, 1946, US Marine corporal William Gaither Pierson and private Warren T. Pritchard stopped Shen Chong, a Peking University student, on her way home and forced her into the Peiping Polo Field. A mechanic from a nearby repair shop reported the crying girl being dragged into the field, first to his peers, then to the police. The mechanics were driven away by the soldiers when they tried to intervene, even with a policeman accompanying in the second attempt. By the time a senior officer arrived at the scene, Pritchard had already left. Later Pierson was convicted by US Marine Court led by Lieutenant Colonel Paul Fitzgerald for raping her, but the verdict was overturned by the US Department of Navy for insufficient evidence.

Public anger
Pierson and US consular official Myrl Myres claimed that Shen Chong was a prostitute, and such claim contributed to the public anger. Shen Chong was reportedly from an elite family of Shen Baozhen and Lin Zexu, and was studying in the most prestigious university in China; thus the claim she was a prostitute was viewed as adding insult to injury. Selective reporting in US media and later acquittal of the soldiers added more fuel to then Chinese public rage against American military presence in China.

In February 1947 alone, police arrested thousands of rape case protesters. The government of the Republic of China's action alienated students and intellectuals and pushed them closer to the communists, who played a leading role in the protests.

Aftermath
Because of the intense publicity, Shen Chong was unable to continue her studies at Peking University. She changed her name to Shen Jun (沈峻) and later was admitted to Fudan University in Shanghai. After graduating with a degree in Russian, she worked in Beijing-based Foreign Languages Press for decades. She married the renowned Chinese cartoonist Ding Cong. For most of her life, the public was unaware of the whereabouts of Shen Chong. In an interview with a journalist in 2012, Shen Jun finally revealed that she was Shen Chong; she also refuted a conspiracy theory that she was collaborating with the Communists to provoke an international incident. She stated that she joined the party in 1956, nearly a decade after the incident. Shen died of lung cancer in Beijing on December 11, 2014, aged 87.

William Gaither Pierson died in 2001 and is buried at Temple Sinai Cemetery in Sumter, South Carolina.

Notes and references

See also
China Marines
Murder of Chen Shijun

1946 in China
Chinese Civil War
Rape in China
United States military scandals
20th century in Beijing
Incidents of violence against women
China–United States relations
1946 crimes in China
Violence against women in China